The Intermediate Region is an established geopolitical model set forth in the 1970s by the Greek historian Dimitri Kitsikis, professor at the University of Ottawa in Canada. According to this model, the Eurasian continent is composed of three regions; in addition to Western Europe and the Far East, a third region called the "Intermediate Region" found between the two constitutes a distinct civilization. It roughly covers Eastern Europe and the Middle East and North Africa (MENA).

Description 

The lands between the Adriatic Sea and the Indus River form the Intermediate Region and are considered a bridge between Western and Eastern civilisations. The vast area extends from the eastern half of Europe to the western half of Asia. Its significance is that there is neither a uniform Europe nor a uniform Asia. Europe and Asia denote geographical regions, not civilisations.

Demographically, the region's dominant religions are Orthodox Christianity and Islam, with Judaism to a lesser extent. In contrast, Catholicism and Protestantism dominate in the West, and Hinduism and Buddhism dominate in the East.

The Intermediate Region had, for 2,500 years, been dominated by an ecumenical empire whose centre lay by the Turkish Straits and the Aegean Sea. It was fundamentally the same empire throughout history, and its successive leaders sought to unify its respective peoples. From the Persian Empire of Darius the Great, it fell into the hands of Alexander the Great, then to the Hellenistic Roman Empire, the Byzantine Empire, and finally the Sunni Ottoman Empire until 1923–1924. This Central Empire had been subject to attempts by other empires situated along its periphery to seize succession. These included the Caliphate, the Persian Empire and the Russian Empire (until 1917).

The dynamic between the Central Empire and the Peripheral Empires constitutes an internal conflict in the Intermediate Region. Each of the main peoples in this area struggled to seize control of its centre of influence, that is, Byzantium-Constantinople-Istanbul, which remained the undisputed focal point for nearly 2,000 years. The Arabs, in the 8th century, and the Russians, in the 20th century, almost succeeded in doing so but were not able to take control of the ecumenical empire. Western intervention, since the 18th century, is considered to be an external conflict, which sought not succession but the destruction of the ecumenical empire and its dismemberment (Balkanisation) and its subjection to the stranglehold of Westernisation.

Kitsikis concludes that “due to historical events spanning thousands of years, the Eurasian continent, of which Europe is but one of its peninsulas, comprises three civilisational areas: a) the West, which today includes the United States, Canada, Australia and New Zealand, as well as Western Europe; b) the East or 'Far East', which includes the peninsulas of India, Southeast Asia (with Indonesia) and China (with Korea and Japan); c) the Intermediate Region, which is found both in the East and the West."

See also
Afro-Eurasia
Arno Peters
Eurasianism
Eurasian Steppe
Geographical midpoint of Europe
Intermarium
Ralph Peters
The Clash of Civilizations
The Geographical Pivot of History
The Great Game

References

Further reading 
 P. Davarinos, Geschichtsschreibung und Politik, Düsseldorf, 1995. (Doctoral thesis). 
 P. Davarinos, "Die Historische Theorie der Zwischenregion in Osten und Westen", Journal of Oriental and African Studies, vol. 10 (1999), pp. 131–143. 
 Dimitri Kitsikis, L'Empire ottoman (The Ottoman Empire), Paris, PUF, 3e éd., 1994.
 Société Royale du Canada, Académie des lettres et des sciences humaines, Géopolitique de la Région intermédiaire (The Geopolitics of the Intermediate Region), Ottawa, vol.52, 1999.
 Dimitri Kitsikis, «Une vision géopolitique: la Région intermédiaire» (A Geopolitical Vision: the Intermediate Region), Relations internationales, Paris, no.109, 2002.
 Dimitri Kitsikis, «Géopolitique d'un Proche-Orient à venir» (The Geopolitics of a future Middle East), Diplomatie, no. 24, 2007.
 E. Konstantinides, "He Geopolitike kai he historia tes mesa apo chartes (Geopolitics and its history through maps)", Trito Mati, Athens, vol.153, 2007
 Geopolitike kai Hellada (Geopolitics and Greece), Athens, Esoptron, 2001.
 Endiamese Perioche (Intermediate Region), quarterly journal on geopolitics, published in Athens since 1996.
 Dimitri Kitsikis, Türk-Yunan İmparatorluğu. Arabölge gerçeği ışığında Osmanlı tarihine bakış (The Turco-Greek Empire. A study of Ottoman history from the point of view of the Intermediate Region), Istanbul, Iletişim, 1996.
 José Pedro Teixeira Fernandes, «A Grécia Moderna e o Ocidente - Entre a Regiao Intermédia e o Ocidente», Historia, no.87, Junho 2006.
 Georgios K. Filis, Russia and Turkey in the Geopolitics of Eurasia & the Theory of Median Space: Thesis-Synthesis-Antithesis, Durham University, United Kingdom, 2008. (Doctoral thesis).
 Georges Prevelakis, Les Balkans: cultures et géopolitique, Paris, Nathan, 1994.
 Georges Prevelakis, Géopolitique de la Grèce, Paris, Editions Complexe, 1997.

External links
 Geopolitics of the Intermediate Region - Dimitri Kitsikis lecturing in English - Moscow 2011
 Geopolitics of the Intermediate Region - Alexandr Dugin lecturing in Russian - Moscow 2011
Dimitri Kitsikis - Intermediate Region - Article - Moscow 14 December 2011
Dimitri Kitsikis - Intermediate Region - Article - Moscow - 19 December 2011
Kitsikis & Dugin parallel approaches

Geopolitics
Geographical neologisms
Eurasianism